Andrés Curruchich (full name Andrés Curruchich Cúmez, sometimes called "Andrew") (19 January 1891 – 18 February 1969) was a Guatemalan naïve painter of the Kaqchikel people from the Kaqchikel town of San Juan Comalapa.

Andrés Curruchich is considered the first and most important of the naïve painters of San Juan Comalapa. He was born in 1891, and began to paint in the 1920s as a means to try to earn extra money. In the 1930s and 1940s he was invited to exhibit his works in various festivals and fairs in Guatemala. By 1950 his work was known in Guatemala City, and at this time he began to paint in oils on canvas. During the 1950s he exhibited in Guatemala City and at various galleries in the United States. His work depicted the life of his native Mayan people in very simple and understandable form. Curruchich was awarded the Order of the Quetzal by the Guatemalan government in 1960 for his value and contribution to the nation, as well as a small pension. He died in 1969.

There is a permanent exhibition of his work at the Ixchel Museum of Indigenous Textiles and Clothing in Guatemala City.

Andrés Curruchich spawned a colony of Kaqchikel painters in San Juan Comalapa, which has become a centre for Mayan naïve art in Guatemala. Some 500 artists work in the town, many of them trained by Curruchich. Among those currently best known today are Oscar Peren, Rosa Elena Currichich, Paula Nicho Cumez and María Elena Curruchiche, both granddaughters of Andrés Curruchich

References
Arte y Literatura de Guatemala: Andrés Curruchich
Book about Andrés Curruchich's work
Spanish language blog about naïve art in Guatemala
Website about culture in San Juan Comalapa
Article about Paula Nicho Cumes
Article about María Elena Curruchiche

Guatemalan artists
Naïve painters
1891 births
1969 deaths
Latin American artists of indigenous descent
Guatemalan Maya people
20th-century indigenous painters of the Americas
Maya painters
Order of the Quetzal
People from Chimaltenango Department
Kaqchikel